Kim Dae-won (born 10 February 1997) is a South Korean football forward, who plays for Gangwon FC in the K League 1. He has previously played for Daegu FC.

Club career
Born on 10 February 1997,  Kim scored a goal on his debut for Daegu FC on 25 May 2016, playing against FC Anyang in the K League 2. In January 2021, he transferred to Gangwon FC.

Club career statistics

International career
In December 2019, Kim was selected to be part of the South Korean squad for the 2020 AFC U-23 Championship, to be held in Thailand. South Korea won the championship, with Kim playing in five matches and scoring a goal against Australia.

Honors and awards

Domestic
Daegu FC
 Korean FA Cup Winners (1) : 2018

International
South Korea U23
AFC U-23 Championship: 2020

Individual
K League 1 Best XI (1): 2022

References

External links 
 

1997 births
Living people
Association football goalkeepers
South Korean footballers
Daegu FC players
Gangwon FC players
K League 1 players